Rufus Crawford is an American actor and retired football player who was a running back for the Hamilton Tiger-Cats from 1979 through 1985. He broke the Canadian Football League yardage record which had stood for 28 years. He started his career in the NFL with the Seattle Seahawks.

Filmography

Film

Television

References

External links 
 

1955 births
Living people
American players of Canadian football
American football return specialists
Canadian football running backs
Seattle Seahawks players
Hamilton Tiger-Cats players
Virginia State Trojans football players
People from Gastonia, North Carolina
Players of American football from North Carolina